KBST may refer to:

 KBST (AM), a radio station (1490 AM) licensed to Big Spring, Texas, United States
 KBST-FM, a radio station (95.7 FM) licensed to Big Spring, Texas, United States
 Belfast Municipal Airport (ICAO code KBST) in Belfast, Maine, United States